Forest 404 is a science fiction podcast written by composer Timothy X Atack, produced by BBC Radio 4 and hosted by Pearl Mackie.

Background 
The University of Bristol, the University of Exeter, and the Open University partnered with BBC Radio 4 to produce the podcast. Every episode in the nine-part series is accompanied by a soundscape and a discussion on the themes. The story follows an audio archivist named Pan who is tasked with deleting recordings that were made before a cataclysmic event. Pan is living in the 24th century. Timothy X Atack credited works by Ursula K. LeGuin, and his own experiences in the BBC's archive of natural history sounds, as influences in the creation of Forest 404.

The show stars Pearl Mackie as Pan, Tanya Moodie as her boss Daria, and Pippa Haywood as Theia.

Reception 
The Guardian called Forest 404 "darkly funny but also infuriating", and "a drama that niggles as much as it intrigues." Sam Fritz at the Mississippi Valley Conservancy recommended the podcast, noting that "The diverse topics around each episode ground the fiction within an application of our own world, helping listeners analyze each episode and picture themselves in the world." "Forest 404 helps us experience life after an entire denuding and automation of our world," according to Heather Sparks in CLOT magazine.

Academic outcomes 
Forest 404 also featured an embedded academic study, led by Alex Smalley at the University of Exeter. Designed to deepen understanding into people's responses to the sounds of nature, the study marked one of the largest natural soundscape experiments ever conducted, with 7,596 people taking part.

Findings from this research were published in the peer-reviewed journal Global Environmental Change in May 2022. Outcomes demonstrated that soundscapes featuring the sounds of wildlife, such as bird song, were considered more psychologically restorative than those without. Participants who had memories triggered by these sounds were also more likely to find them psychologically restorative, and exhibited a greater motivation to preserve them – an outcome with implications for conservation efforts.

See also 

 List of science fiction podcasts

References

External links 
 

2019 podcast debuts
2019 podcast endings
Audio podcasts
BBC Radio 4 programmes
Science fiction podcasts
British podcasts